Jose Franklin (born 27 November 1989) is an Indian composer. He primarily scores music for Tamil films. He made his debut as a composer in the 2018 Tamil film Seemathurai.

Career 
Jose Franklin is a music director who works in the Tamil Film industry. He composes music and does Background Score in Tamil movies. He composed music for the movie named Seemathurai directed by Santhosh Thiyagarajan, starring Varsha Bollamma and Geethan Britto, which released in 2018. His recognized work was in the film called Nedunalvaadai directed by Selva Kannan, which released in the year 2019.

He has also composed music for the 2014 Tamil short film called Miracle Babies wrote and directed by Bijoy Lona. He was also associated in other movies like 6Athiyayam written by Ajayan Bala and Cable Sankar, and Kalam directed by Robert Raaj.

Discography 

 As composer

 As singer

References

External links 

1989 births
Living people
Tamil film score composers